The Pakistan cricket team toured India from 25 December 2012 to 6 January 2013. The tour consisted of three One Day International, and two Twenty20 International matches. This was Pakistan's first cricket tour of India in five years. Several photography agencies, including Getty Images, have been barred from taking pictures following a dispute with the Board of Control for Cricket in India. The Twenty20 series was drawn 1–1; Pakistan won the ODI series 2–1. As of 2022, this is the last bilateral series to have taken place between the two nations.

Squads

1 Shoaib Malik and Mohammad Irfan were retained in the ODI squad on the basis of performing well in T20I series.

T20I series

1st T20I

2nd T20I

ODI series

1st ODI

2nd ODI

3rd ODI

Broadcasters

References

External links
Tour website on ESPN CricInfo
Fixture on BCCI.tv

2012 in Indian cricket
2012 in Pakistani cricket
2013 in Indian cricket
2013 in Pakistani cricket
Indian cricket seasons from 2000–01
International cricket competitions in 2012–13
2012-13
December 2012 sports events in India
January 2013 sports events in India